Rameshwar S. Bhagat is an Indian film editor and alumni of Yash Raj Films.

Awards 

 National Film Award for Best Editing in 64th National Film Awards for Ventilator
 Filmfare Award for Best Editing in 50th Filmfare Awards for Dhoom

References 

Best Editor National Film Award winners
Filmfare Awards winners
Living people
Year of birth missing (living people)